In classical architecture, a tambour (Fr.: "drum") is the inverted bell of the Corinthian capital around which are carved acanthus leaves for decoration.

The term also applies to the wall of a circular structure, whether on the ground or raised aloft on pendentives and carrying a dome (also known as a tholobate), and to the drum-shaped segments of a column, which is built up in several courses.

A cover made of strips of wood connected together with fabric such as that of a roll-top desk is called a tambour. This has been adopted to describe an office cupboard that is designed to have doors that conceal within the cabinet when opened, also known as roller-shutters.

See also 
 Tholobate

Notes

References
 

Columns and entablature
Furniture